Sushrut Badhe (Sanskrit: सुश्रुत् बढे, born 21 April 1990) is an Indian author, researcher on Sanskrit scripture and manufacturer of Ayurvedic products. He has rewritten the Sanskrit scriptures Bhagavad Gita and three Upanishads, Isha, Kena and Mandukya in rhymed English.

Education and work 
Born in Puducherry, after completing his bachelor's degree in mechanical engineering from Pondicherry Engineering College (P.E.C.), Badhe joined Sri M.R.Damle in 2011 as his shishya in KVM Research Laboratories to learn about Gita, manufacturing and research of Ayurvedic Medicines.

Currently, Badhe is CEO of KVM Research Laboratories which manufactures Ayurvedic Health products and is a researcher at Midam Charitable Trust where he studies the use of Vedic Chants for children with Autism Spectrum Disorder through the Vedic Chants Intervention Program (VCIP) designed by Sri M.R.Damle.

Sanskrit Scriptures as rhymes 
In 2014, he published a book of poems titled "The Rhythm of the Spirit", a collection of select 34 poems on Man, Life and God. The poem 'A Father's Song' from the book was appreciated by former President Dr.A.P.J.Abdul kalam. In the same year, Badhe published an e-book "Voice of Krishna: Secrets of the Self" in which he rewrote the First V Chapters of the Sanskrit scripture Bhagavad Gita into English rhymes.  His views on poetry were quoted by Jernail Singh Anand, noted environmentalist  and column writer in a research paper on "Poetic Discourse":

"A poet is not the creator, but the created. He is nothing more than a pen- a mere instrument in the hands of a mystic invisible wielder. The true poet owns neither the words nor the impact that the words create."  - Poetic Discourse: For Whom the Pen Rolls, P 804

In 2015, Badhe rendered all 700 Sanskrit verses of the 18 Chapters of the Gita into English rhymes and released a paperback "Bhagavad Gita: Rhythm of Krishna" under Sri Aurobindo's Action Publications.

In 2016, he rewrote three Sanskrit Upanishads in rhymed English. He has also launched the first Mobile app to have Upanishad in audio rhyme format.

In 2022, Badhe launched a book titled Sri Aurobindo's Vedanta- Rhythm of Ananda at the Pondicherry-Auroville Poetry Festival (PPF). 

Badhe has also recorded and released the Sanskrit texts in rhyme format though audio, mobile application and video broadcasts. He also writes in the Sri Aurobindo's Action, a journal associated with Sri Aurobindo Ashram.

Currently he is writing verses from the Rig Veda in rhymes.

Bhagavad Gita: Rhythm of Krishna 
His book "Bhagavad Gita: Rhythm of Krishna" which contains a rhyme rendition of all the shlokas of the Gita is multi-layered, offering practical and metaphysical knowledge. It earned him a place in the Limca Book of Records

In 2021, in a philosophical exploration in the  Journal of religion and health , he co-authored a paper "COVID‑19, Moral Injury and the Bhagvad Gita" with neurologist Dr. Sunil Narayan and Psychiatrist Dr.Bindu Menon. In the study, four Ds- Detachment, Duty, Doer-ship and Dhyana or meditation from the Gita were explored for their utility for  Health Care workers (HCW) faced with moral and psychological distress.

Verses from his book, Bhagavad Gita: Rhythm of Krishna were cited:

“Vested you are with the authority to perform,

But not seek your action’s fruits in any form

When by the fruits of actions you aren’t motivated

From discharging your duties, you never get deviated 2.47 

Perform your every action in this Yogic way

All attachments Arjuna, you must throw away

From accomplishments and loss find your release

Then you shall attain the Yogic poise and peace". 2.48

Vedic Chants Intervention Program (VCIP) 
The Vedic Chants Intervention Program (VCIP) is a group therapy designed by Sri M.R.Damle for the management of children with Autism Spectrum Disorder. In 2014, as a researcher of Midam Charitable Trust, he conducted a collaborative research with Dinesh Kumar of Department of Genetics, Madras University on the effect of Vedic Chants on children with Autism Spectrum Disorder. Currently, Badhe is collaborating with eminent Neurologist Dr.Sunil Narayan of JIPMER to study the impact of Vedic Chants on children with autism and other neural disorders.

In 2023, his research papers on 'Vedic therapeutics for children with special needs: A review of our lived experiences and challenges in implementing the Vedic chants intervention program (VCIP) and on 'Nutritional psychiatry concepts in the Bhagavad Gita' bagged prizes at the world Sanskrit conference organised by Srinivas university Mangalore.

Krishna's Butter Project 
Designed by Sri M.R.Damle, the Krishna's Butter project was launched in 2015 with the aim of introducing the Bhagavad Gita to school going children. Sushrut's "Bhagavad Gita: Rhythm of Krishna" and Senior Pathologist Dr. Bhawana Badhe's "Krishna's Butter for Champion Students" was used for developing a Gita teaching module for kids with practical examples and meaningful illustrations. During COVID-19 lock down, Krishna's Butter project launched online classrooms for children worldwide in six Indian regional languages. Sushrut started an adult version of the program.

In 2022, Midam Charitable Trust released its sixth book: “Krishnana Navaneeta”, which is the Kannada translation of the standardised teaching module of Bhagavad Gita for school children done by Mrs.Chitra Torvi. The module, which was taught in schools since 2015, became viral during the lockdown and over 3,000 children from across the world enrolled in the free 19-day digital workshops on the Gita for kids and was declared a world record title by Assist World Records Foundation. The reference book has been translated into Tamil, Hindi, Malayalam, Marathi & Kannada languages and contains 19 practical lessons for children, 19 cartoon illustrations, 99 Select Bhagavad Gita verses and 99 English rhyming translations.

Bibliography 

 Rhythm of the Spirit by Sushrut Badhe, Cyberwit.net, 2014
 Voice of Krishna: Secrets of the Self by Sushrut Badhe, Independently Published, 2014
 Bhagavad Gita: Rhythm of Krishna by Sushrut Badhe, Sri Aurobindo's Action Publications, 2015
 A Glimpse of the Spirit: Compilations from Sri Aurobindo's Action - the Journal of India's Resurgence by Sushrut Badhe, Independently Published, 2019
 Rhythm of the Veda: Know your Devas by Sushrut Badhe, Midam Charitable Trust Publications, 2021
 Sri Aurobindo's Vedanta: Rhythm of Ananda by Sushrut Badhe, Midam Charitable Trust Publications, 2022

References 

1990 births
Indian poets
Living people
People from Puducherry